The 1999 Swale Borough Council election took place on 6 May 1999 to elect members of Swale Borough Council in Kent, England. One third of the council was up for election and the council remained under no overall control.

After the election, the composition of the council was
Liberal Democrats 23
Labour 17
Conservative 9

Election result

References

1999
1999 English local elections
1990s in Kent